Udea fimbriatralis is a species of moth in the family Crambidae. It is found in Spain, France, Croatia, Bosnia and Herzegovina, Romania, Bulgaria, the Republic of Macedonia, Greece, Turkey and Russia.

References

fimbriatralis
Moths of Europe
Moths described in 1834
Taxa named by Philogène Auguste Joseph Duponchel